Janet Dawson MBE (born 1935) is an Australian artist who was a pioneer of abstract painting in Australia in the 1960s, having been introduced to abstraction during studies in England while she lived in Europe 1957–1960 She was also an accomplished lithographic printer of her own works as well as those of other renowned Australian artists, a theatre-set and furniture designer. She studied in England and Italy on scholarships before returning to Australia in 1960. She won the Art Gallery of New South Wales Archibald Prize in 1973 with the portrait of her husband, Michael Boddy Reading.  She has exhibited across Australia and overseas, and her work is held in major Australian and English collections. In 1977 she was awarded an MBE for services to art.

Career 
Dawson was born in Sydney in 1935 and spent her early years in Forbes. She started to take a keen interest in art at age 11 beginning her formal art tuition in Saturday morning classes at H. Septimus Power’s private art school from 1946 to 1949, before living in Clarence Street, East Malvern working as a doctor's receptionist while she studied (1952 to 1956) at the National Gallery of Victoria Art School in Melbourne first under William Dargie, who was then replaced by Alan Sumner as head of school. Art critic Robert Hughes in 1962 after Sumner's resignation wrote complaining that "since his appointment as the school's head in 1947, Mr Sumner seems to have produced no young painter whose work is of any significance whatever — except Janet Dawson,  whose unquestionable talent comes, in part, from a revolt against the flaccid academism Mr Sumner has preached." 

In 1955 Dawson won Gallery Art School Prizes including the Grace Joel Scholarship (Nude), Hugh Ramsey Portrait Prize, one for an ‘Abstract Painting’, another for 'A Panel of Three Drawings from Life', a 2nd prize for a 'Head study', and the 'National Gallery Society Scholarship for best subject drawing or panel of drawings in exhibition.' 

A 1955 newspaper article reports that as an art student "she concentrates mainly on semi-abstracts and enjoys working on large canvases. Murals are her particular interest" and that "her highest ambition is to win the school’s travelling scholarship" of £900 for three years study abroad, then held by West Australian painter Frances Woolley (b.1930). Indeed, the following year she was the joint winner, with friend Kathleen Boyle, of the award; the National Gallery of Victoria Travelling Scholarship, for a painting of three figures on the Gallery steps, reporting that she; "made a model of plasticine and painted the picture from that." Aged 22, she embarked on the SS Roma.

International study and travel 
Landing in Genoa in mid July 1957, and stopping at Milan, Bern and Paris, Dawson arrived in London. There she studied at the Slade School of Fine Art between late 1957 and mid-1959. In London, Janet attended an exhibition New American Art at the Tate in 1959 and was impressed by the simplicity and glowing colours of paintings by Rothko, Still, and Motherwell. In Paris she saw the work of Dubuffet and Miro which also had a decisive influence.  

Deborah Clark notes; "The influence of European surrealism can be seen in Dawson's use of particular marks and symbols, and her admiration for the warmth and openness of American abstract painters like Jackson Pollock and Mark Rothko (whose work she saw at the Tate Gallery in 1959) also emerges, but her use of formal devices of abstraction is embedded in a genuine response to the sensations of the landscape itself."

She loved to draw, so she studied lithography, which allows an artist to draw directly on a printing stone.  In 1959 she won the Slade School lithography prize which included a Boise scholarship that enabled her to travel to Italy. There, from late 1959 to early 1960, she took up residence in the hilltop village of Anticoli Corrado where the British School at Rome retained workspaces for artists. During her three months there, Dawson made drawings of the landscape which are held by the National Gallery of Victoria, the Art Gallery of New South Wales and the NGA. Abstraction, which she had once found disturbing, in her Italian landscape drawings appears in "sensual renderings," broad strokes; waves, marks and symbols that covered the paper so that hills and valleys were transformed into sensual lines and motifs. Her art became almost exclusively abstract.

From Italy, Dawson travelled to Paris early in 1960. At the Dutch Tachiste Nono Reinhold's Atelier Patris that ran 1957–61 at 26 rue Boulard, where she was the only woman amongst five printers,  she worked printing for School of Paris artists in Paris, proof printing lithographs by artists Pierre Soulages, Fritz Hundertwasser and Kumi Sugai and others, and translated her Italian drawings into lithographs with bold colours, lines and strokes  The five lithographs she made at the Atelier Patris in Paris during 1960 are in the collections of the NGV, the AGNSW and the NGA. Dawson returned to Melbourne in late 1960.

Gallery A 
Returning after nearly four years to Australia in late November 1960  Rather than any of the range of fine art galleries in Melbourne, Dawson chose Gallery A, a design and furniture retail space that included an art gallery in Flinders St. for her first solo show opening 18 May 1961, then was employed by the gallery with responsibilities that included collaborating with dealer Max Hutchinson and furniture designer and sculptor, Clement Meadmore on the gallery's major 1961 exhibition The Bauhaus: Aspects and Influence.  Dawson also founded the Gallery A Print Workshop,  working at the studio as a lithographic proof printer for visiting artists, described by James Gleeson as 'pioneering' Australian graphic arts.  In this role she introduced Australian artists including John Brack, John Olsen and Fred Williams to lithography. Among her students were Graeme Cohen, Richard Havyatt and Winston Thomas. Also in 1961, in November she issued a call amongst Australian printmakers for works, 10 of which were to be chosen to represent the country in Prints of the World being organised by collector and curator Robert Erskine in London. A special September 1963 edition of Meanjin devoted to French writing featured her work on its cover and as illustrations throughout.

Working as the gallery manager and technical assistant, Dawson's abstraction developed through her adoption of acrylic paint and shaped composition boards. Related to, and influential on her art, was her design of furniture for the gallery, one item of which is in the Queensland Art Gallery Collection from her ‘Living Art’ table top series of 1964 made at the invitation of the Australian Laminex company and fabricated by Steven Davis in Melbourne. Angela Goddard describes Dawson's tables as;

Having shown prints and drawings at Gallery A, she held her first painting solo there in 1964.

Colour field painting 
Robert Lindsay notes that; "It was through a group of artists returning to Australia in the early and mid 1960s that the new international style became established. Janet Dawson returned in 1961, Dick Watkins in 1962, Sydney Ball from New York in 1965, and also in 1965 Tony McGillick..." 

Artists from this group, including Dawson, were represented 21 August–28 September 1968 in The Field, the exhibition inaugurating the new venue of the NGV on St. Kilda Road Melbourne. Curators of the exhibition John Stringer, Exhibitions Officer, and Brian Finemore, Curator of Australian Art selected two works by Dawson. One of only three women invited, beside Wendy Paramour and Normana Wright, she showed her large-scale recent works; Wall 11, 1968–69, synthetic polymer paint on canvas, 184.3 x 184.4 cm., which was soon purchased by the National Gallery of Australia in 1969; and Rollascape 2, 1968, synthetic polymer paint on an irregularly-shaped composition board, 150.0 x 275.0 cm. The latter was purchased by the Art Gallery of Ballarat with assistance of the Visual Arts/Craft Board of the Australia Council, in 1988.

During the 1970s Dawson moved away from such Hard Edge abstraction to a more 'painterly' style, but maintained her formal vocabulary; at the time of her 1979 survey show Mary Eagle noted "she sees everything in nature blending, flowing together..."

Style and reception 
James Gleeson, comparing works of Dawson, Rapotec and Coburn in a group show at Hungry Horse Gallery in August 1964, notes "the serenity of spirit that lies behind the vivacious conversation of Janet Dawson’s colours," and goes on to predict that;

Dawson was involved in the Colour Field movement; abstraction that used flat, solid and graduated hues to make colour its own subject. Art historian Bernard Smith writes that "Colour painting first began to appear rather hesitantly upon the Australian scene around 1963. Two artists are of special importance for its appearance, Dick Watkins in Sydney and Janet Dawson in Melbourne." She was among the artists exhibited in The Field  at the National Gallery of Victoria in 1968.  The exhibition opened too much controversy, but launched the careers of many of the young artists. Dawson was one of only three women artists in the exhibition, (re-staged in 2018). Donald Brook, in  year of The Field, reviewed a May exhibition Paintings by Janet Dawson at Gallery A, and described her approach at the time to the painting as an object;

In 1970 Brook expands on this assessment:

Mary Eagle identifies in Dawson's early painting "themes of architectural and atmospheric space and light and images of clouds, moons and rainbows" that continue into her abstract work.

Of Dawson's winning the Archibald Prize which marks a point in her career of departure from pure abstraction, art historian Patrick McCaughey praised the "loose painterly treatment of figure and supports" and considered her success "surprising and deserving" because "Miss Dawson is better known as a sophisticated abstract painter. To find her venturing into the staid area of the Archibald and then carrying all before her is a marvellous reversal of the expected..."

Remarking on work Dawson produced after moving to country Binalong, Daniel Thomas in a 1974 review declared her "one of Australia's very best artists", but "now 'modern' only in the sense that she knows all about colour and form and surface; she can clamp forms to the edge of her canvas, secure in the knowledge that all is masterfully under control." He considers the show evidence of "her perhaps reluctant return to the 'old-fashioned'. The exhibition is not only about pink and yellow singing together...It is also about agriculture and being cold, and needing rain, and about how the gum trees at the bottom of the paddock are primeval, grey, hairy monsters. If anyone does an exhibition of gum-tree painting, Janet Dawson now has to be included, along with Lister Lister, Hans Heysen and Sidney Nolan." In an August 1977 Gallery A show she augmented such imagery, though on a macro scale, without the gum trees, with collage, as Nancy Borlase notes in her review; 

Gary Catalano writing in 1988 about her solo show in Richmond, questions, then reluctantly concurs with, Eagle's comparison of Dawson's metaphysics with Blake's, and highlights the artist's surrealism:  

Catalano's 1997 interview with the artist allowed Dawson to give her own response to the question of metaphysics:

On the occasion of Dawson's 1996 drawing survey at the National Gallery of Australia, John McDonald of The Sydney Morning Herald remarked that the exhibition was;
Considering later work McDonald remarks that;

Partnership 
In 1968 Dawson married Michael Boddy (1934–2016), a British-born playwright and actor, educated at Cambridge, who migrated to Australia in 1960 and whom she met in 1963 in Melbourne while she was designing for the Emerald Hill Theatre and on the set of his play You'll Come to Love Your Sperm Test. At that time she was working 1969–1971 full-time in the display department of the Australian Museum, Sydney, which she credits, because of the 'natural history' to which it exposed her, as an influence on her painting. 

In 1973 she produced sets for productions of Boddy's plays The Legend of King O'Malley and Cash, illustrations for a collection of essays on O'Malley and Boddy's "The Last Supper Show" at the Nimrod Theatre where he was playwright-in-residence. They partnered in a program in schools on the production and staging of plays before  moving from Waverley to the village of Binalong, New South Wales, and with a paining of her husband surrounded by gardening implements Dawson became the third woman to win the Archibald Prize for her Michael Boddy Reading,'Informal study: Archibald Prize to woman,' The Sydney Morning Herald Saturday, 19 Jan 1974, p.5 her first and only entry in the Prize. 

In 1977 they lived at 'Scribble Rock', a small property just outside the settlement, and there, from 22 December 1994 to May 1995 she produced the Scribble Rock Red Cabbage series purchased in its entirety by the National Gallery of Australia. In 1981 Dawson and her husband relocated to Canberra to help establish Theatre ACT, returning to Binalong in 1985. That year, the Australia Council awarded Dawson the A$19,250 full standard artist's grant.

Boddy died in 2016 and Dawson moved to Ocean Grove, Victoria. Michael had three children, including a son who pre-deceased Boddy.

Exhibitions 
 1961: solo show, paintings, lithographs, drawings, Gallery A, Melbourne.
 1963: Prints '63, Studio One Printmakers. Skinner Galleries (1963 – 1963); Newcastle Region Art Gallery (1 September 1963 – 1 September 1963); Castlemaine Art Gallery And Historical Museum (1 September 1963 – 1 September 1963); Rudy Komon Art Gallery (1 September 1963 – 1 September 1963); Douglas Gallery (1 September 1963 – 1 September 1963); National Gallery Of Victoria (11 September 1963 – 6 October 1963); Bonython Art Gallery, Adelaide (1 October 1963 – 1 October 1963); Yosheido Gallery, Tokyo (1964 – 1964)
 1964, August: group show, Hungry Horse Gallery, Sydney
 1965: Introduction '65,  Janet Dawson, Leonard Hessing, Robert Klippel, Colin Lanceley, John Olsen, Charles Reddington. Gallery A, Melbourne
 1966: included in an exhibition of contemporary Australian painting in Los Angeles and San Francisco
 1966/7: Gallery A. Summer exhibition 66, Australian paintings drawings watercolours sculpture. Artists exhibiting were Sydney Ball, Jennifer Barwell, Henry Bastin, Charles Blackman, Arthur Boyd, John Brack, Donald Brook, Mike Brown, Judy Cassab, Peter Clarke, John Coburn, Martin Collocott, Jack Courier, Ray Crooke, Robert Dickerson, Russell Drysdale, Peggy Fauser, Maximilian Feuerring, John Firth-Smith, William Frater, Peter Freeman, Leonard French, Donald Friend, Marjorie Gillespie, James Gleeson, Thomas Gleghorn, Anne Hall, Pro Hart, Elaine Haxton, John Henshaw, Daryl Hill, Ludwig Hirschfeld-Mack, Leonard Hessing, Perle Hessing, Robert Hughes, Robert Klippel, Michael Kmit, Colin Lanceley, Richard Larter, Francis Lymburner, Elwyn Lynn, Mary MacQueen, Marsha Morgan, Sydney Nolan, Alan Oldfield, John Olsen, Stan Ostoja-Kotkowski, William Peascod, John Perceval, Carl Plate, Peter Powditch, Clifton Pugh, Emanuel Raft, Stanislaus Rapotec, Charles Reddington, Stephen Reed, John Rigby, Jan Riske, William Rose, Rosemary Ryan, Gareth Sansom, Michael Shannon, Imre Szigeti, Michael Taylor, Stan De Teliga, Peter Upward, David Warren, Guy Warren, Richard Weight, Robert Williams, Les Willis, Ken Whisson, Peter Wright. Shown in both Melbourne and Sydney branches of Gallery A and continued until 24 February 1967
 1968:The Field exhibition. Two paintings included amongst 74 abstract works by 40 artists working in hard edge abstraction, colour field painting, using shaped canvases, and conceptual art. National Gallery of Victoria
 1979: survey exhibition, National Gallery of Victoria
 1988, Feb-Mar: solo show, 312 Lennox St., Richmond
 1996, 22 June–11 August: The Drawings of Janet Dawson; survey show, National Gallery of Australia
1998–2019: Six solo shows at Stella Downer Fine Art, Sydney
 2000: Challenge and Response in Australian Art, 1955–65, National Gallery of Australia 2002 Intimate Portraits, National Portrait Gallery, Canberra
 2002–2019: Ten group shows at Charles Nodrum Gallery, Melbourne
 2006: Survey Exhibition, Bathurst Gallery, NSW; S.H. Ervin Gallery, Sydney; University of Queensland Art Museum; Tasmanian Museum and Art Gallery; Mornington Peninsula Regional Art Gallery, Vic.
 2007–2019: Group shows at Stella Downer Fine Art, Sydney
 2008: Modern Times, Powerhouse Museum, Sydney
 2012: Janet Dawson: A Personal View, Goulburn Regional Art Gallery, NSW
 2015/19: Two solo shows at Nancy Sever Gallery, Canberra
 2017: Abstraction: Celebrating Australian Women Abstract Artists, Geelong Art Gallery, Vic. and travelling
 2018: The Field Revisited, National Gallery of Victoria
 2019: Trying to find comfort in an uncomfortable chair - Paintings from the Cruthers Collection of Australian Women’s Art, University of Western Australia, Perth
 2019: Cloud Comics, Nancy Sever Gallery, Canberra
 2020: Know My Name featuring 150 female Australian artists from 1900 to the 21st century, National Gallery of Australia

Awards and recognition 

 1956: National Gallery of Victoria Travelling Scholarship
 1959: Boise Scholarship
 1973: Archibald Prize 
 1977: MBE for service to art
 1985: Australia Council for the Arts grant

Collections 

 Royal Society, London
 Art Gallery of New South Wales
 National Gallery of Australia
 National Gallery of Victoria
 Art Gallery of South Australia

References

Further reading 
 Deborah Clark, The Drawings of Janet Dawson, 1956 to the Present, exhibition catalogue, National Gallery of Australia, 1996.
 Gary Catalano, ‘A Natural History (Interview)’, Art & Australia, Vol. 34, No. 3, 1997, p. 332-341 and illus. cover. 
 Andrew Sayers, Intimate Portraits, exhibition catalogue, National Portrait Gallery, Canberra, 2002.
 Daniel Thomas, ‘Golden Oldies’, Art & Australia, Vol. 50, No. 4, 2013, p. 582–589.

External links 
 Artcyclopedia
 Biography

Archibald Prize winners
1935 births
Living people
Australian women painters
20th-century Australian women artists
20th-century Australian artists
21st-century Australian women artists
21st-century Australian artists
Australian designers
Australian lithographers
Australian printmakers
Theatre designers
Abstract painters
Artists from Sydney
Australian Members of the Order of the British Empire
Women lithographers
National Gallery of Victoria Art School alumni